The 1986–87 Atlantic Coast Hockey League season was the sixth season of the Atlantic Coast Hockey League, a North American minor professional league. Five teams participated in the regular season. The New York Slapshots moved to Troy, New York to be re-named the Troy Slapshots before they folded after only six games and merged the player roster with the league’s Mohawk Valley Comets franchise. The Virginia Lancers were the league champions.

Regular season

Playoffs

External links
 Season 1986/87 on hockeydb.com

Atlantic Coast Hockey League seasons
ACHL